Cossus subocellatus is a moth in the family Cossidae. The distribution of the species is unknown.

The forewings are imperfectly reticulated with black, with a straight slightly oblique black band near the base, and with two slender curved black subapical bands, one in front, the other behind. The hindwings are slightly reticulated, brownish above.

References

Natural History Museum Lepidoptera generic names catalog

Cossus
Moths described in 1856